Christopher Charles "Chris" Pond is a historian, librarian, and politician, was born in 1949 in Walthamstow, Essex (now part of the London Borough of Waltham Forest), and grew up in Chingford, moving to Loughton, Essex in 1981.

Early life
He attended Sir George Monoux Grammar School and Queens' College, Cambridge. His PhD (faculty of geography and geology) was obtained in 1981 under Sir Clifford Darby.

Latterly an Honorary Fellow of the Chartered Institute of Library and Information Professionals, he was Head of Reference Services at the House of Commons Library, secretary and then chairman of the FDA House of Commons branch, and then for 15 years President of the Trade Union Side, House of Commons. He was awarded the Order of the British Empire in 2002. Officers of the House of Commons serve with complete political impartiality, and are generally debarred from seeking elected office, but Pond, as an independent, was permitted to stand whilst an officer of the House.

Pond is the author of numerous books and articles on the history of Essex and the Epping Forest area, and on railways and architectural history; and has served in various capacities in the Victorian Society, Loughton & District Historical Society and president of the Walthamstow Historical Society. He was instrumental in securing refusal of an application to demolish most of the cordite factory at the Waltham Abbey Royal Gunpowder Mills in 2016, and moved the motion and outlined the reasons, for rejecting an application to build a large depot for Next plc in June 2021, a decision that was subsequently upheld by the Planning Inspectorate. This was widely reported as a victory for the countryside over big business (see, e.g. https://cpressex.org.uk/inspector-dismisses-appeal-by-next-in-its-bid-to-build-distribution-centre/

Political career
A member of the Loughton Residents Association, he has been an elected independent politician, as town councillor on Loughton Town Council since 1996, district councillor on Epping Forest District Council since 2014, and county councillor on Essex County Council since 2005, where he is (2017) leader of the Non-aligned Group and (2021), Leader of the Opposition. He was a member, and latterly Chairman, of the Lopping Hall Trust charity from 2000 to 2014.

During the years 1997 to 2005, he was often confused with Chris Pond, then MP for Gravesham, because of the unusual coincidence of the shared name and age.

Personal life
He married Caroline Copeman in 1973.

Elections contested
Essex County Council elections

Epping Forest District Council elections

Selected bibliography
 The Railway to Walthamstow and Chingford (1970, with others as part of the Line 112 Group)
 Walks in Loughton's Forest: Short Epping Forest Walks in and Around Loughton by Chris Pond and Caroline Pond (Paperback - 3 Mar 2007)
 The Loughton Railway 150 Years on: The Leyton-Woodford-Loughton Railway from Eastern Counties to Central Line by Chris Pond, Ian Strugnell, and Ted Martin (Paperback - 10 Jun 2006)
 The Early History of the House of Commons Library: Reports from Standing Committees on the Library of the House 1840-1856 (House of Commons Library Document)
 The Buildings of Loughton (2nd ed., 2009)
 Larkswood : a history of Larkswood school, formerly South Chingford Primary, New Road, Chingford 1906-2006; by John Conen with Chris Pond. Loughton: The authors, 2006. 60 p., [8 p. of plates. .]

References

External links
 ASLIB Training: Public Courses
 http://www.cilip.org.uk/NR/rdonlyres/18D406E6-CCBE-4CF7-A8F6-3AE3A91813F9/0/SCOOPParltOnline2007AprilProgramme.pdf
 Councillors by District - Epping Forest
 http://www.loughton-tc.gov.uk/7anrep3.pdf
 Order of the British Empire, Civil
 Order of the British Empire

1949 births
Living people
English librarians
Alumni of Queens' College, Cambridge
People from Loughton
People from Walthamstow
Independent politicians in England
Members of Essex County Council